Ascoviridae is a family of double strand DNA viruses that infect primarily invertebrates, mainly noctuids and spodoptera species; it contains two genera, Ascovirus, which contains three species, and Toursvirus with a single species Diadromus pulchellus toursvirus.

Taxonomy
The family contains the following genera and species:
 Ascovirus
 Heliothis virescens ascovirus 3a
 Spodoptera frugiperda ascovirus 1a
 Trichoplusia ni ascovirus 2a
 Toursvirus
 Diadromus pulchellus toursvirus

Genome

The genome is not segmented and contains a single molecule of circular double-stranded DNA. The genome has a guanine + cytosine content of 42-60%.

The genome of Spodoptera frugiperda ascovirus 1a has been sequenced. It is 156,922 bases in length and encodes 123 putative open reading frames. The G+C ratio is 49.2%. Among the encoded proteins are a caspase, a cathepsin B, several kinases, E3 ubiquitin ligases, a fatty acid elongase, a sphingomyelinase, a phosphate acyltransferase and a patatin-like phospholipase.

Virology
The virions consist of an envelope, a core, and an internal lipid membrane associated with the inner particle. The virus capsid is enveloped and measures 130 nm in diameter, and 200-240 nm in length. Virions are bacilliform, ovoid, and allantoid.

These viruses infect immature stages of the order Lepidoptera, in which they cause a chronic, fatal disease. They are transmissed by endoparasitic wasps and the host develops a unique cytopathology that resembles apoptosis. Cell infection induces apoptosis and in some species is associated with synthesis of a virus-encoded executioner caspase and several lipid-metabolizing enzymes. After infection the host cell DNA is degraded, the nucleus fragments and the cell then cleaves into large virion-containing vesicles. Synthesis of viral proteins results in the rescue of developing apoptotic bodies that are converted into large vesicles in which virions accumulate and continue to assemble. In infected larvae, millions of these virion-containing vesicles begin to disperse from infected tissues 48–72 hours after infection into the haemolymph, making it milky white, a characteristic of this disease.  The circulation of virions and vesicles in the blood facilitates mechanical transmission by parasitic wasps.

Evolution
Ascoviruses evolved from iridoviruses (family Iridoviridae) that also attack lepidopteran larvae. Furthermore, ascoviruses have been suggested as the evolutionary source of ichnoviruses (family Polydnaviridae), although other studies have not been able to confirm this link.

References

External links 

 ICTV Online (10th) Report: Ascoviridae/
 Viralzone: Ascoviridae/
 

 
Nucleocytoplasmic large DNA viruses
Virus families